"Everybody Movin" is the fifth promotional single from French music producer and DJ Bob Sinclar's studio album Western Dream, featuring Ron Carroll and Mz Toni. The single was released to Spanish dance radio in November 2006. It is considered the fourth single from the album in Spain and the fifth for other countries.

Track listing
Promo single
 "Everybody Movin'" (featuring Ron Carroll and Mz Toni) – 4:38
 "Everybody Movin'" (Eddie Thoneick & Kurd Maverick Remix) – 7:35

CD, maxi-single 8-track (D:vision Records; DV 489.07 CDS)
 "Everybody Movin'" (Radio Edit) – 3:49
 "Everybody Movin'" (Ron Carroll Remix Radio) – 3:17
 "Everybody Movin'" (Woody Bianchi Movin' Remix Radio) – 3:43
 "Everybody Movin'" (Kurd Maverick & Eddie Thoneick Remix) – 7:37
 "Everybody Movin'" (Guy Schreiner Remix) – 5:40
 "Everybody Movin'" (Ron Carroll Remix) – 7:02
 "Everybody Movin'" (Woody Bianchi Movin' Remix) – 7:45
 "Everybody Movin'" (Original Club Mix) – 5:28

Charts

References

Bob Sinclar songs
2007 songs
Songs written by Bob Sinclar
Ministry of Sound singles
Tommy Boy Records singles